Schinia avemensis, the gold-edged gem, is a moth of the family Noctuidae. The species was first described by Harrison Gray Dyar Jr. in 1904. It is found in only three colonies in the southern prairie provinces of Canada, the Spirit Dunes at Spruce Woods Provincial Park, Manitoba; the Burstall dunes in south-western Saskatchewan; and in a small dune complex in the Red Deer River valley north of Bindloss. It will probably also be found in other active dune complexes in the southern parts of Alberta and Saskatchewan. It has also been recorded from Colorado.

The wingspan is 16–18 mm. Adults are on wing from July to August depending on the location.

The larvae feed on Helianthus petiolaris.

References

Schinia
Moths of North America
Moths described in 1904